Serge Grouard (born 19 March 1959) was a member of the National Assembly of France.  He represented Loiret's 2nd constituency from 2002 to 2017, as a member of The Republicans. He served as mayor of Orléans between 2001 and 2015 and was reelected in 2020.

References

1959 births
Living people
Politicians from Paris
The Republicans (France) politicians
Union for a Popular Movement politicians
Gaullism, a way forward for France
Mayors of Orléans
Sciences Po alumni
Deputies of the 12th National Assembly of the French Fifth Republic
Deputies of the 13th National Assembly of the French Fifth Republic
Deputies of the 14th National Assembly of the French Fifth Republic